Zeffry J. Alkatiri (Jakarta, Indonesia, August 30, 1959) is an Indonesian author and academic. He is a lecturer and researcher in the Faculty of Cultural Sciences at the University of Indonesia. In 2012 he received a Khatulistiwa Literary Award in the poetry category for a collection of poems titled Post Kolonial dan Wisata Sejarah dalam Sajak.

References

1959 births
Living people
Academic staff of the University of Indonesia